Bruno Sutkus (14 May 1924 – 29 August 2003) was a Lithuanian-German sniper in the 68th Infantry Division of the German Army, on the Eastern Front of World War II, and was credited with 209 kills. Every kill was recorded in an individual "sniper's book" and had to be confirmed by at least one observer and authenticated by the battalion commander. Facsimile copies of various diary pages are reproduced in Sutkus' memoir. After the dissolution of the Soviet Union, Sutkus held lectures for Lithuanian soldiers and presented his wartime records to Lithuanian officers.

Biography
Sutkus was born in Tannenwalde, then a suburb of Königsberg, East Prussia. His father was Lithuanian, which meant that Sutkus was not automatically German, German nationality had to be applied for. Since no application was made he remained officially stateless until 1941 when he became a naturalized German. He joined the Hitler Youth in 1938, achieving the rank of a Scharführer. When he was 18 years old he became a member of the SA, where his shooting skills were acknowledged, and he was given a rifle to take home and practise marksmanship.

Sutkus trained as a sniper from August 1943 through the end of December 1943 at the Sniper School in Vilnius, before being assigned to the 196th Grenadier Regiment of the 68th Infantry Division. In January 1945 while recovering from a wound he was promoted and informed that he had been appointed as an instructor at a sniper school.

In his autobiography, Sutkus describes that after the war he came into contact with the anti-Soviet Lithuanian resistance, how he was captured and tortured by the KGB. He was in possession of forged documents declaring him to be stateless and of having worked throughout the war as a farm labourer, but knew the Russians suspected him of having served in the Wehrmacht as a sniper. So Sutkus decided to stay together with several Lithuanians he knew who were deported to Siberia for forced labor, partly to escape Soviet attentions, and expecting to be deported anyway.

By the time the Russians had the evidence to prosecute him for the war crime of being a sniper, West German Chancellor Konrad Adenauer had negotiated amnesties for many Germans being detained in the Soviet Union. He worked on collectives, in the Taiga forests and down the pits at Sheernkov from 1949 until 1971 when he was allowed to relocate to Vilnius. Sutkus went into voluntary banishment to accompany a Lithuanian woman, Antanina, (d. 1995) nineteen years his senior, who had been linked to the resistance. He had a son, Vytautas, by her in 1951. In 1991, after the collapse of the Soviet Union, Sutkus, now Lithuanian after having been forced to accept Soviet citizenship, visited Germany. He wrote a memoir and helped train the Lithuanian army after Lithuania gained independence, giving lectures. In 1994 he received a certificate of German citizenship and passport, and relocated to Germany in 1997.

Awards
Iron Cross 2nd Class on July 6, 1944
Wound Badge in black on September 7, 1944
Iron Cross 1st Class on November 16, 1944
Sniper's Badge (1st class - gold) on November 21, 1944
Infantry Assault Badge in silver on November 29, 1944
Wound Badge in silver on March 1, 1945

References

Citations

Bibliography

 "Lietuvos aidas", Nr. 93(6814). Saulius Šaltenis. "Karo meistras". May 6, 1995 (Lithuanian newspaper)
 Sutkus, Bruno (2003), Im Fadenkreuz – Tagebuch eines Scharfschützen [i.e. Inside the crosshair - the diary of a sniper]. Munin.

1924 births
2003 deaths
German people of Lithuanian descent
Lithuanian people of German descent
Naturalized citizens of Germany
Military personnel from Königsberg
Recipients of the Iron Cross (1939), 1st class
German military snipers
German Army soldiers of World War II
Hitler Youth members
Sturmabteilung personnel
Gulag detainees